The Institute for Operations Research and the Management Sciences (INFORMS) is an international society for practitioners in the fields of operations research (O.R.), management science, and analytics. It was established in 1995 with the merger of the Operations Research Society of America (ORSA) and The Institute of Management Sciences (TIMS).

The INFORMS Roundtable includes institutional members from operations research departments at major organizations.

INFORMS administers the honor society Omega Rho.

See also 
 Institute of Industrial Engineers

References 

 Chile wins international prize for the development of analytical tools against the pandemic
 Vishal Gupta Awarded INFORMS Wagner Prize for System to Curb COVID Spread in Greece

External links 
 INFORMS homepage

Operations research societies
Catonsville, Maryland
1995 establishments in Maryland
Scientific organizations established in 1995